Liberty was built at Broadstairs in 1784 as a West Indiaman. She made one voyage to the West Indies for the British East India Company (EIC) in 1795. A French squadron burnt her at Montserrat in 1805

Career
Liberty first appeared in Lloyd's Register (LR) in 1784 with R. Carey, master, Blackman, owner, and trade London–Barbados. The entry also showed her as "British" built.

In 1795 Captain Richard Carey sailed Liberty to the West Indies on a voyage for the EIC. Liberty sailed from Dunnose, Isle of Wight, on 25 May, and arrived at Barbados on 25 July. She was at St Eustatia on 2 August, and arrived back at Portsmouth on 3 October. The reason for the voyage on behalf of the EIC is obscure.

Fate
On 9 March 1805 a French squadron from Rochefort burnt Liberty, of London, Heppinstal, master, Hamilton, Derbyshire, master, and Sarah, of Liverpool, Jacks, master, at Montserrat.

Citations

1784 ships
Age of Sail merchant ships of England
Ships of the British East India Company
Captured ships
Maritime incidents in 1805
Ship fires
Shipwrecks in the Caribbean Sea